{{DISPLAYTITLE:C29H42O6}}
The molecular formula C29H42O6 may refer to:

 Hydrocortisone cypionate, a synthetic glucocorticoid corticosteroid and a corticosteroid ester
 Kendomycin, an anticancer macrolide

Molecular formulas